Lysinibacillus louembei is a Gram-positive, aerobic, rod-shaped and motile bacterium from the genus of Lysinibacillus.

References

Bacillaceae
Bacteria described in 2015